Atlas Entertainment is an American film financing and production company, started by Charles Roven, Bob Cavallo and Dawn Steel in 1995.

History 
In 1990, Charles Roven and partner Bob Cavallo formed Roven/Cavallo Entertainment. At the same time, wife Dawn Steel, who was formerly employee of Columbia Pictures formed Steel Pictures, and signed a deal with Walt Disney Studios to produce feature films.

In 1995, they merged Roven/Cavallo Entertainment with Steel Pictures to create a new entity Atlas Entertainment, and it signed an exclusive feature film deal with Turner Pictures.

In 1997, Bob Cavallo left Atlas Entertainment to join Walt Disney Studios. Later that year, Dawn Steel, a manager in the company, died.

On July 29, 1999, Atlas Entertainment was merged with Gold/Miller Management to create Mosaic Media Group.

In 2008, Charles Roven split off their ties from Mosaic Media Group, and relaunched Atlas Entertainment with a first-look deal at Sony Pictures.

On May 6, 2014, Atlas promoted Curt Kanemoto from production executive to VP of production, joining Andy Horwitz and Jake Kurily, Topher Rhys-Lawrence from first assistant to creative executive, joining Rebecca Roven and Dan Wiedenhaupt, and promoted Patrick Blood from Atlas executive to VP of legal and business affairs. In December 2014, Atlas started its subsidiary, a management company called Atlas Artists, headed by Dave Fleming.

Charles Roven and Richard Suckle produced 2013 film American Hustle, for which both producers were nominated for Academy Award for Best Picture.  12 Monkeys episode “Mentally Divergent”  was also nominated for Cinematography Awards. Atlas also produced the films The Whole Truth with Suckle, while Warcraft (release date June 10, 2016) and Batman v Superman: Dawn of Justice (release date March 25, 2016) with Roven. Uncharted was also produced by Atlas along with Arad Productions.

Filmography

Theatrical films

1990s

2000s

2010s

2020s

Upcoming

Direct-to-video/streaming films

Television series

Television films

References 

Film production companies of the United States
Companies based in Los Angeles
Mass media companies established in 1994
American companies established in 1994
1999 disestablishments in California
Mass media companies established in 2008
Re-established companies